The Word magazine is a Brussels-based, bi-annual lifestyle, photography and art magazine.

References

External links
Official website

Magazines published in Belgium
Biannual magazines
English-language magazines
Lifestyle magazines
Magazines with year of establishment missing
Magazines published in Brussels
Visual arts magazines